Suzanne RD Tata (nee Brière, 1880–1923), also known as Sooni Ratanji Dadabhoy Tata, was the French wife of Indian businessman Ratanji Dadabhoy Tata. She is known for being the first woman in India to drive a car, in 1905.

She was born in Paris. She married businessman Ratanji Dadabhoy Tata, chairman of the Tata Group, a member of the Tata family, soon after he began to learn French, and they were married in Paris in 1902. At the time of her marriage, she converted to Zoroastrianism from Christianity and began to be known as Sooni, or Soona. The couple had five children Rodabeh, Jehangir, Jimmy, Sylla, and Dorab. Her son Jehangir, known as J. R. D. Tata, took over his father's business, while one of her daughters, Sylla, was married to businessman Sir Dinshaw Maneckji Petit, 3rd Baronet, brother of Rattanbai Petit, the wife of Muhammad Ali Jinnah. Suzanne Brière made her first flight in an aeroplane in 1913 and died in 1923.

In the early 20th century, Tata had some difficulties in reconciling her French and Indian identities.

References

1880 births
1923 deaths
French emigrants to India
Indian Zoroastrians
Converts to Zoroastrianism from Christianity
Tata family